Jorge Insunza Gregorio de Las Heras (born 12 February 1967) is a Chilean politician and lobbyist. He was minister during the second government of Michelle Bachelet.

References

External links
 Profile at BCN

1967 births
Living people
People from Santiago
Chilean people of Basque descent
Socialist Party of Chile politicians
Party for Democracy (Chile) politicians
Deputies of the LII Legislative Period of the National Congress of Chile
Deputies of the LIV Legislative Period of the National Congress of Chile
Diego Portales University alumni
Bolivarian University of Chile alumni